Guia, Ilha e Mata Mourisca is a civil parish in the municipality of Pombal, Portugal. It was formed in 2013 by the merger of the former parishes Guia, Ilha and Mata Mourisca. The population in 2011 was 6,489, in an area of 80.37 km².

References

Parishes of Pombal, Portugal